KTN News is a 24-hour based television network created by the Kenya Television Network, which associates with current events and affairs facing Kenya. It is mostly news, updates and stories coverage and is one of the fastest growing TV stations in Kenya. It has content that include sports,  documentaries and investigative series. The station was launched in 2015 according to the Standard Media Group, which houses the station and Kenya Television Network (KTN). The station can be accessed in East Africa at Communication systems like DsTV-247, GoTv-97 and Zuku-14. It broadcasts in Swahili and English.

YouTube 
KTN Kenya has been posting videos in YouTube since 2015 and its views have been increasing rapidly.  It has created 31 playlists and posted more than 70,000 videos and has received more than 178.4 Million views and 335,270 subscribers. KTN Kenya also has a secondary YouTube channel, KTNClassics, the KTNClassics videos are videos that were aired live in the Kenya Television Network.

Programming 
List of programs aired by KTN

References 

Media of Kenya